The enzyme  hydroxybutyrate-dimer hydrolase (EC 3.1.1.22) catalyzes the reaction

(R)-3-((R)-3-hydroxybutanoyloxy)butanoate + H2O  2 (R)-3-hydroxybutanoate

This enzyme belongs to the family of hydrolases, specifically those acting on carboxylic ester bonds.  The systematic name is (R)-3-((R)-3-hydroxybutanoyloxy)butanoate hydroxybutanoylhydrolase. The enzyme is also called D-(–)-3-hydroxybutyrate-dimer hydrolase.  It participates in butanoate metabolism.

References

 

EC 3.1.1
Enzymes of unknown structure